Telphusa necromantis is a moth of the family Gelechiidae. It lives in South Korea, Japan and China.

The larvae feed on Quercus serrata, whose leaves their parents tie together. The species is thought to overwinter in the larval stage.

References

Moths described in 1932
Telphusa
Taxa named by Edward Meyrick